George Albert Sullivan (March 3, 1926 – December 30, 2016) was an American football end who played for the Boston Yanks. He played college football at University of Notre Dame, having previously attended Walpole High School.

References

1926 births
2016 deaths
American football ends
Notre Dame Fighting Irish football players
Boston Yanks players
Players of American football from Massachusetts
People from Norwood, Massachusetts